Christiane Pheil (born May 21, 1989) is an American rugby union player. She was selected for the squad to the 2017 Women's Rugby World Cup in Ireland.

Biography 
Born in St. Petersburg, Florida to David and Carlyn Pheil. At Asheville High School she participated in tennis, track and field and cross country. Pheil started playing tennis since she was seven years old and attended the University of Colorado Boulder on a tennis scholarship.

References

External links 
 Christiane Pheil at USA Rugby
 

1989 births
Living people
American female rugby union players
United States women's international rugby union players
Pennsylvania State University alumni
University of Colorado Boulder alumni
21st-century American women